Algeria competed at the 2016 Summer Paralympics in Rio de Janeiro, Brazil, from 7 to 18 September 2016.

Disability classifications 

Every participant at the Paralympics has their disability grouped into one of ten disability categories: impaired muscle power, impaired passive range of movement, limb deficiency, leg length difference, short stature, hypertonia, ataxia, athetosis, vision impairment and intellectual impairment. Each Paralympic sport then has its own classifications, dependent upon the specific physical demands of competition. Events are given a code, made of numbers and letters, describing the type of event and classification of the athletes competing. Some sports, such as athletics, divide athletes by both the category and severity of their disabilities, other sports, for example swimming, group competitors from different categories together, the only separation being based on the severity of the disability.

Competitors

Medallists
Algeria finished the Games ranked fourth among African nations for total gold medals won in Rio with 4.  They were behind Nigeria, South Africa and Tunisia.  Algeria finished with 16 medals total. 
| width=75% align=left valign=top |

| width=25% align=left valign=top |

Athletics

| width="20%" align="left" valign="top" |

| width="80%" align="left" valign="top" |

Men's Track

Men's Field

Women's Track

Women's Field

Goalball

Men's tournament

Algeria's men enter the tournament ranked 12th in the world.

Women's tournament

The Algeria women's national goalball team qualified for the Rio Games after winning the African championship by defeating Egypt 11–1 in the final.  Other teams participating in the qualifier included Tunisia and Morocco.  Ghana was scheduled to compete, but pulled out of the event. The team played in a Rio warmup tournament in Malmo, Sweden where they finished tenth.  The national team is coached by Mohamed Bettahrat. Algeria's women enter the tournament ranked 23rd in the world.

Judo 

With one pathway for qualification being having a top finish at the 2014 IBSA Judo World Championships, Algeria earned a qualifying spot in Rio base on the performance of Noura Mouloud in the men's -60 kg event.  The B3 Judoka finished first in his class.

Men

Women

Powerlifting 

Samira Guerioua qualified to represent Algeria at the 2016 Games in powerlifting. The 32-year-old is a member of the Bir Mourad Rais club.  Nationally, she is coached by Mohamed-Salah Ben Atta.

Women

Wheelchair basketball

Men's tournament

The Algeria men's national wheelchair basketball team has qualified for the 2016 Rio Paralympics.  The team participated in the Arab Championship "Open" in July 2016 as part of their Rio preparation efforts. At the event, Algeria defeated Iraq by a score of 48–24, Morocco by a score of 77–72, South Africa by a score of 79–53, Kuwait by a score of 87-25 and Saudi Arabia by a score of 63–33.  Nabil Gueddoun led his team in scoring going into elimination play.

11th/12th place playoff

Women's tournament

The Algeria women's national wheelchair basketball team qualified for the 2016 Rio Paralympics. As hosts, Brazil got to choose which group they were put into. They were partnered with Algeria, who would be put in the group they did not choose. Brazil chose Group A, which included Canada, Germany, Great Britain and Argentina. Algeria ended up in Group B with the United States, the Netherlands, France and China.

9th/10th place match

See also
Algeria at the 2016 Summer Olympics

References 

Nations at the 2016 Summer Paralympics
2016
2016 in Algerian sport